Raychael Stine (born April 19, 1981) is an American painter and educator. She has exhibited nationally and internationally, and is a professor at the University of New Mexico.

Biography

Raychael Stine was born and spent her early years in Chardon, Ohio. Her family moved briefly to New Jersey before settling in north Texas, where she attended Flower Mound High School. She received her BFA in painting at the University of Texas at Dallas. She received an MFA at the University of Illinois Chicago. She lives in Albuquerque, New Mexico, where she is Assistant Professor in Painting & Drawing at the University of New Mexico.

Subjects and themes

Stine is known for her use of dogs as a primary subject of her paintings. About this practice she states, "It's sort of illegal subject matter in the serious contemporary art world because it's really sentimental and soft, and it's not thought of as intellectual or conceptual. But figuring out how to relate to something or understand it physically and visually is like the entire process of a painting."

Stine was selected for New American Paintings Issues 132, 120 and 78 where she was awarded Juror’s Pick, the New Insight Exhibition at Art Chicago, and her work was exhibited in the Texas Biennial 2008.

References

Citations

Works cited

Further reading

External links
 

1981 births
Living people
21st-century American painters
21st-century American women artists
American educators
American women academics
Educators from Ohio
Painters from Ohio
People from Chardon, Ohio
University of New Mexico faculty
University of Texas at Dallas alumni